Alison Leatherbarrow is a former England women's international footballer. She represented the England women's national football team at senior international level and spent most of her career at Fodens Ladies F.C..

Honors
Fodens Ladies F.C.
 FA Women's Cup: 1973–74

References

Living people
English women's footballers
Doncaster Rovers Belles L.F.C. players
England women's international footballers
Fodens Ladies F.C. players
English expatriates in France
Women's association footballers not categorized by position
Year of birth missing (living people)